Mukkattukara is a residential area situated in the city of Thrissur, in the Kerala state of India. Mukkattukara is Ward 10 of Thrissur Municipal Corporation.
Three schools are situated in Mukkattukara: Bethlehem Convent higher secondary school, St. Geoege's UP school, and St. George's LP school.

See also
Thrissur
Thrissur District
List of Thrissur Corporation wards

References

Suburbs of Thrissur city